Bakata is a department or commune of Ziro Province in Burkina Faso.

Cities 
The department consists of a chief town :

 Bakata

and 13 villages:

 Basnéré
 Biyéné
 Boulé-Daboré
 Boulé-Gala
 Bouyoua

 Diao
 Kinkirsgogo
 Kou
 Kouboulou

 Lorou
 Payiri
 Tayalo
 Zinloua.

References 

Departments of Burkina Faso
Ziro Province